La Ward is a city in Jackson County, Texas, United States. The population was 213 at the 2010 census.

Geography

History
The community emerged on the coastal prairie in 1904 with the arrival of the St. Louis, Brownsville and Mexico Railway. It was named for Lafayette Ward, a local person who became a leader in introducing Hereford, Brahman, and Jersey cattle to Texas. By 1914, La Ward had developed into a cattle and shipping center. The community had its own independent school district and an estimated population of 200 in 1940. That number would rise to around 300 by the early 1960s. La Ward's population declined to 247 in 1970, to 218 in 1980, and to 162 in 1990. It increased to 200 in 2000, a 23 percent increase over the 1990 figure.

Demographics

As of the 2000 census there were 200 people, 63 households, and 50 families residing in the city. The population density was 245.8 people per square mile (95.3/km2). There were 79 housing units at an average density of 97.1/sq mi (37.7/km2). The racial makeup of the city was 86.00% White, 1.00% Native American, 12.50% from other races, and 0.50% from two or more races. Hispanic or Latino of any race were 32.50% of the population.

There were 63 households, 42.9% of which had children age 17 or younger, 66.7% were married couples living together, 6.3% had a female householder with no husband present, and 20.6% were non-families. 17.5% of all households were made up of individuals, and 12.7% had someone living alone who was 65 years of age or older. The average household size was 3.17 and the average family size was 3.66.

In the city, the population was spread out, with 32.0% under the age of 18, 9.5% from 18 to 24, 29.5% from 25 to 44, 16.0% from 45 to 64, and 13.0% who were 65 years of age or older. The median age was 32 years. For every 100 females, there were 83.5 males. For every 100 females age 18 and over, there were 83.8 males.

The median income for a household in the city was $26,250, and the median income for a family was $45,833. Males had a median income of $33,750 versus $23,750 for females. The per capita income for the city was $15,633. About 5.2% of families and 6.8% of the population were below the poverty line, including 6.5% of those under the age of eighteen and 4.9% of those 65 or over.

Education
Public education in the city of La Ward is provided by the Industrial Independent School District. The district has served La Ward since its creation in 1949.

References

Cities in Texas
Cities in Jackson County, Texas